Max Wilkie Chu (born 21 March 2000) is a New Zealand cricketer. He made his first-class debut for Otago in the 2018–19 Plunket Shield season on 1 March 2019. Prior to his first-class debut, he was named in New Zealand's squad for the 2018 Under-19 Cricket World Cup. In February 2019, he also played for the New Zealand XI side in a 50-over tour match against Bangladesh. He made his Twenty20 debut on 14 December 2019, for Otago in the 2019–20 Super Smash.

In June 2020, he was offered a contract by Otago ahead of the 2020–21 domestic cricket season. He made his List A debut on 19 February 2021, for Otago in the 2020–21 Ford Trophy. In November 2021, in the 2021–22 Plunket Shield season, Chu scored his maiden century in first-class cricket with 103 not out.

References

External links
 

2000 births
Living people
New Zealand cricketers
Otago cricketers
Place of birth missing (living people)